Amy Gough (born August 24, 1977, in Williams Lake, British Columbia) is a Canadian skeleton racer who has competed since 2002. Her best result in a Skeleton World Cup event was first at Winterberg, Germany in December 2011, while her best overall finish in a Skeleton World Cup was fifth in the 2010–11 Skeleton World Cup.

Gough's best finish at the FIBT World Championships was fourth in the mixed bobsleigh-skeleton team event at St. Moritz in 2007.

She qualified for the 2010 Winter Olympics, finishing seventh in the women's skeleton event.

References

External links
 
 
 
 

1977 births
Canadian female skeleton racers
Living people
Olympic skeleton racers of Canada
Skeleton racers at the 2010 Winter Olympics
20th-century Canadian women
21st-century Canadian women